Irinel is a Romanian masculine (feminine: "Irina") given name. Notable people with the name include:

Irinel Pănulescu (born 1964), Romanian swimmer
Irinel Popescu (born 1953), Romanian surgeon
Irinel Voicu (born 1977), Romanian footballer

Romanian masculine given names
Romanian feminine given names
Unisex given names